is a former Japanese football player and manager.

Playing career
Kurihara was born in Ota, Tokyo on May 20, 1973. After graduating from Komazawa University, he joined J1 League club Verdy Kawasaki in 1996. He played as forward from first season. The club won the champions 1996 Emperor's Cup and he also scored a goal in the Final. However he could not play many matches and moved to Bellmare Hiratsuka (later Shonan Bellmare) on loan in 1998. At Bellmare, he played many matches. In 1999, he returned to Verdy and played many matches. In 2000, he moved to Sanfrecce Hiroshima. In 2001, he moved to J2 League Shonan Bellmare again and played as regular player in 2 seasons. In 2003, he moved to J2 club Albirex Niigata. At Albirex, he was converted to offensive midfielder and played as substitute. The club won the champions in 2003 and was promoted to J1 from 2004. In 2005, he moved to Vissel Kobe. In 2005, he played as substitute midfielder and the club was relegated to J2 from 2006. From 2006, he became a regular player and the club was returned to J1 in a year. In 2009, he moved to newly was promoted to J2 League club, Tochigi SC. He retired end of 2009 season.

Coaching career
After retirement, Kurihara started coaching career at Vissel Kobe in 2010. In 2014, he moved to newly was promoted to J3 League club, Fukushima United FC and became a manager. He managed the club in 3 season until 2016.

Club statistics

Managerial statistics

References

External links
 
 

1973 births
Living people
Komazawa University alumni
Association football people from Tokyo
Japanese footballers
J1 League players
J2 League players
Tokyo Verdy players
Shonan Bellmare players
Sanfrecce Hiroshima players
Albirex Niigata players
Vissel Kobe players
Tochigi SC players
Japanese football managers
J3 League managers
Fukushima United FC managers
Association football midfielders